Mary Elizabeth Fairhurst (August 13, 1957 — December 28, 2021) was an American attorney and jurist who served as a justice and chief justice of the Washington Supreme Court.

Early life and education 

A native of Olympia, Washington, Fairhurst earned her undergraduate degree in political science from Gonzaga University in 1979, graduating cum laude. In 1984, she earned her Juris Doctor from Gonzaga University School of Law, graduating magna cum laude.

Career 
Fairhurst served in the Attorney General of Washington's office under Christine Gregoire and Ken Eikenberry. Fairhurst worked on a constitutional amendment to increase the rights of crime victims. She also organized statewide conferences on domestic violence.

Fairhurt joined the Washington Supreme Court after a successful election in 2003. In 2008, she won re-election against Michael J. Bond. On November 4, 2016, it was announced that Fairhurst had been elected Chief Justice of the Washington State Supreme Court.

Fairhurst served as the president of the Washington State Bar Association. She also served on the Bar Board of Governors representing Washington's 3rd congressional district and as the President of the Washington Women Lawyers.

In October 2018, Fairhurst wrote the majority opinion on a ruling to abolish state's death penalty. In 2019, Fairhurst received the American Inns of Court Professionalism Award for the Ninth Circuit at the Judicial Conference of the Ninth Circuit in Spokane, Washington.

Retirement and death 
In October 2019, Fairhurst announced that she would retire from the court in January 2020, citing health concerns. On December 4, 2019, Governor Jay Inslee nominated Raquel Montoya-Lewis to succeed Fairhurst. Montoya-Lewis is the first Native American to serve on the Washington Supreme Court.

In 2020, Fairhurst received the Charles A. Goldmark Distinguished Service Award. On August 22, 2020, Fairhurst became the seventh Lynn Allen Award recipient.

Fairhurst died from cancer in Olympia, Washington, on December 28, 2021, at the age of 64. She had been treated for colon cancer starting in 2008.

See also
List of female state supreme court justices

References

|-

1957 births
2021 deaths
21st-century American judges
21st-century American women judges
Chief Justices of the Washington Supreme Court
Gonzaga University School of Law alumni
Justices of the Washington Supreme Court
People from Olympia, Washington
Washington (state) Democrats
Women chief justices of state supreme courts in the United States